2-Z is an album by the American jazz pianist Matthew Shipp with AACM saxophonist Roscoe Mitchell, recorded in 1995 and released on the 2.13.61 label. Shipp played previously with Mitchell's Note Factory on the album This Dance Is for Steve McCall, but 2-Z represents their first collaboration with Shipp as a leader.

Reception

In his review for AllMusic, Chris Kelsey states: "The men speak the same language —albeit with slightly different accents— and they communicate quite well. A nice record." The Penguin Guide to Jazz wrote that the album "is a meeting of generations, and Shipp sounds respectful and happy to take second place for much of it, constantly searching for some normative path that might hint at a tonal centre".

Track listing
All compositions by Matthew Shipp and Roscoe Mitchell
 "2-Z" – 3:11
 "2-Z-2" – 4:03
 "2-Z-3" – 4:45
 "2-Z-4" – 3:47
 "2-Z-5" – 2:53
 "2-Z-6" – 2:46
 "2-Z-7" – 2:40
 "2-Z-8" – 4:13
 "2-Z-9" – 2:54
 "2-Z-10" – 6:02
 "2-Z-11 (The Physics of Angels)"  – 6:46

Personnel
Matthew Shipp - piano
Roscoe Mitchell – alto sax, soprano sax

References

1996 albums
Matthew Shipp albums
2.13.61 albums